A constitutional referendum was held in Western Samoa on 12 November 1990. Voters were asked whether they approved of the introduction of universal suffrage and a second chamber of Parliament. The first change was approved by 52.6% of voters, but the second opposed by 60.7%. Voter turnout was 74.3% for the first question and 73.7% for the second.

Although universal suffrage was introduced, candidates in elections still had to be part of the Matai.

Results

Question One: Universal Suffrage

Question Two: Second chamber of Parliament

References

Western Samoa
1990 in Samoa
Referendums in Samoa
Constitutional referendums